Kamla Abou Zekry (born January 8, 1974) is an Egyptian television and film director who directed well-known movies and TV series such as Bent Esmaha Zaat, Segn El Nisaa, and Wahed Sefr. She has taken part in many international and national film festivals, including the Cairo International Film Festival, the Dubai International Film Festival, and the Venice Film Festival. Her films have also been screened at the Cannes Film Festival.

Life
Abou Zekry was born in Cairo, Egypt. She graduated from the High Cinema Institute, and started her film career by collaborating with Nadel Galal on 131 Ashghal in 1993.

Sekry has collaborated with screenwriter Mariam Naoom on several TV series. A Girl Named Zat (2013) was an adaptation of Sonallah Ibrahim's 1992 novel Zaat. Women's Prison (2014), based on a play by Fathia al-Assal, was shot in Qanater Prison.

Abou Zekry was quick to respond to the January 25 Revolution. 18 Days was a collaboration with Mariam Abou Auf, while God's Creation followed the story of a girl selling tea on the street who joins the revolution.

A Day for Women was the opening film at Cairo Film Festival in winter 2016.

Works

Films
 (with Nadel Galal) 131 Ashghal / 131 Works, 1993
 Qittar Al Sa’aa Al Sadisah / The Six O’ Clock Train, 1999. Short film.
 (with Nader Galal) Hello America, 2000
 Sanna Oula Nasb / First Year Con, 2004. Feature film.
 Malek wa ketaba, 2005. Feature film.
 An el ashq wel hawa, 2006
 (with Mariam Abou Auf) Tamantashar Yom / 18 Days, 2011
 Khelket Rabena / God's Creation, 2011
 A Day for Women, 2016

TV Series
 6 Midan El-Tahrir, 2009
 Wahed-Sefr / One-Zero, 2009
 A Girl Named Zat, 2013
 Segn El Nesa / Women's Jail, 2014
 Wahet El Ghoroub / Sunset Oasis, 2017
 100 Wesh / 100 Face, 2020
 Bitulou' Al-Rouh/As the Spirit breaks out (in critique of ISIS), 2022

References

External links
 
 Kamlah Abou Zekry on elcinema.com
 Kamla Abou Zekry on Festival Scope Pro
 Abu Zekri Kamla on africine.org (in French)

Egyptian television directors
1974 births
Egyptian film directors
Living people